Ishan Nilaksha (born 9 May 1994) is a Sri Lankan cricketer. He made his first-class debut for Saracens Sports Club in the 2013–14 Premier Trophy on 8 April 2014.

References

External links
 

1994 births
Living people
Sri Lankan cricketers
Saracens Sports Club cricketers
Cricketers from Colombo